The Mayola (also: Mairola) is a short mountain river that flows through the Alpes-Maritimes department of southeastern France. It passes through Puget-Rostang, and it flows into the Roudoule north of Puget-Théniers.

References

Rivers of France
Rivers of Alpes-Maritimes
Rivers of Provence-Alpes-Côte d'Azur